Jamie Stephen Quarry  (born 15 November 1972) is a British former decathlete.

Biography
Quarry was raised in England and qualified to represent Scotland as his mother is from Stirling. He is also of Jamaican descent, with his father's cousin being Olympic gold medalist Don Quarrie.

Involved in multiple sports growing up, Quarry captained a Crystal Palace schoolboys team in football and was selected to represent Kent in rugby union. He competed in his first decathlon at the age of 14.

A three-time Commonwealth Games representative, Quarry earned a bronze medal at his farewell appearance in Manchester in 2002, which was Scotland's first-ever medal in the event. His previous Commonwealth Games finishes were eighth in 1994 (Victoria) and tenth in 1998 (Kuala Lumpur).

Quarry was involved in Glasgow's successful bid to host the 2014 Commonwealth Games.

References

External links
Jamie Quarry at World Athletics

1972 births
Living people
British decathletes
Scottish male athletes
English people of Scottish descent
English people of Jamaican descent
Commonwealth Games bronze medallists for Scotland
Commonwealth Games medallists in athletics
Medallists at the 2002 Commonwealth Games
Athletes (track and field) at the 1994 Commonwealth Games
Athletes (track and field) at the 1998 Commonwealth Games
Competitors at the 1995 Summer Universiade
Competitors at the 1997 Summer Universiade